Frederick Marple (1871 – 1931) was an English footballer who played for Burslem Port Vale in the 1890s.

Career
Marple joined Burslem Port Vale in September 1894, scoring on his debut in a 2–1 defeat to Bury at the Athletic Ground on the 15th of that month. He was only to play one more Second Division game however, before his release, which probably came at the end of the 1894–95 season.

Career statistics
Source:

References

1871 births
1931 deaths
People from Longton, Staffordshire
English footballers
Association football wingers
Port Vale F.C. players
English Football League players